Veneziani is an Italian surname. Notable people with the surname include:

Carlo Veneziani (1882–1950), Italian playwright and screenwriter
Jole Veneziani (1901–1989), Italian fashion designer

Italian-language surnames
Italian toponymic surnames